The 2004 Syracuse Orange football team represented Syracuse University during the 2004 NCAA Division I-A football season. The Orange were coached by Paul Pasqualoni and played their home games at the Carrier Dome in Syracuse, New York.

This was the first season in which Syracuse used the nickname of Orange. Previously, Syracuse had respectively used "Orangemen" for men's sports, including football, and "Orangewomen" for women's sports.

In 2015, Syracuse vacated the six wins from this season among others from the 2005 and 2006 seasons following an eight-year NCAA investigation, as the NCAA found that some football players who committed academic fraud participated in the wins.

Schedule

References

Syracuse
Syracuse Orange football seasons
Syracuse Orange football